When Do You Commit Suicide? (French:Quand te tues-tu?) is a 1931 American comedy film directed by Roger Capellani and starring Robert Burnier, Noël-Noël, and Simone Vaudry. It was made at Joinville Studios by the French subsidiary of Paramount Pictures. A separate Spanish-language version was made at Joinville the following year. In 1953 the film was remade again in French.

Cast
 Robert Burnier as Le vicomte Xavier du Venoux  
 Noël-Noël as Léon Mirol  
 Simone Vaudry as Gaby  
 Madeleine Guitty as La concierge  
 Palau as M. Lemant  
 Jeanne Fusier-Gir as Virginie 
 Christian Argentin 
 Georges Bever 
 Alexandre Dréan as Petavey  
 Yvonne Hébert 
 Armand Lurville as M. Meyse  
 Marc-Hély

References

Bibliography
 Goble, Alan. The Complete Index to Literary Sources in Film. Walter de Gruyter, 1999.

External links
 

1931 films
1931 comedy films
1930s French-language films
American comedy films
Films directed by Roger Capellani
American multilingual films
Films shot at Joinville Studios
Paramount Pictures films
American black-and-white films
1931 multilingual films
1930s American films